Fresno shootings may refer to:

 2017 Fresno shootings, which occurred at a Motel 6 and the downtown area
 2019 Fresno shooting, which occurred at a football watch party